There Was a Country: A Personal History of Biafra is a personal account by Nigerian writer Chinua Achebe of the Nigerian Civil War, also known as the Biafran War. It is considered one of the defining works of modern African non-fiction. Released in October 2012, six months prior to Achebe's death, it is the author's last published book.

References 

Nigerian non-fiction books
Books by Chinua Achebe
2012 non-fiction books
Allen Lane (imprint) books